Biola Alabi is a Nigerian businesswoman. She is the CEO of Biola Alabi Media (BAM), a production company that produces TV series and movies for the Nigerian market, such as the food travel series Bukas and Joints, movies; Lara and the Beat  and Banana Island Ghost. She previously served as Managing Director for M-Net Africa part of the globally-renowned Naspers Group, where she launched seven Africa Magic channels including the indigenous language channels; Africa Magic Yoruba and Hausa. She also developed the Africa Magic Viewers’ Choice Awards which is regarded as the “African Oscars”.

Biola Alabi is an active angel investor  and advisor in the fast-growing African technology and media startup ecosystem. She is a limited partner in numerous funds, and has invested in companies like Trove Technologies, and Chekkit. She is a Non-Executive Director at Unilever Nigeria PLC, a member of the board of directors at Monty Mobile, and the Chairwoman of  Big Cabal Media.

Early life and education 
Biola was born in the US to Nigerian parents. The eldest among four children of Yoruba origin, her father is from Akure in Ondo State, while her mother is from Ilesa, a town in Osun State. Alabi attended University of Cincinnati where she graduated with a degree in Public and Community Health, she furthered her education with a program at Harvard University's Kennedy School of Government and Yale University's Jackson Institute of Global Affairs.

Career
Alabi founded Grooming for Greatness, a leadership development and mentorship program for a new generation for African leaders. Alabi held the position of Managing Director for M-Net Africa, part of the Naspers Group. Prior to this, she was based in the United States where she was part of the executive team at the influential children's television brand Sesame Street, and a member of the marketing team that launched the Korean motor vehicle corporation Daewoo in the USA. In 2018, Alabi took part initialing massive collaboration art piece Remember To Rise.

Corporate Boards 

 Unilever Nigeria PLC, Non-Executive Director 
 Monty Mobile, Member of the Board of Directors
 Big Cabal Media, Chairwoman

Biola Alabi Media (BAM)
Biola Alabi Media (BAM) which began in 2015 is a production company that provides services to broadcasting stations, digital industries and entertainment distribution platforms.
BAM tells African stories to the world. Its first TV show, Bukas and Joint was widely received. It was rated the most watched TV food show across the country.

Filmography
Banana Island Ghost
Lara and the Beat

Awards and recognition
2012 – 20 Youngest Power Women in Africa by Forbes Magazine  
2012 – World Economic Forum Young Global Leader  
2013 – CNBC Africa's AABLA West African Business Woman of the Year 
2014 – Yale World Fellows Recipient (Named 1 of 16) 
2018 – Financial Times top 100 global female executive

See also
 List of Nigerian film producers

References

Year of birth missing (living people)
Living people
Nigerian film producers
21st-century Nigerian businesspeople
Nigerian women company founders
Businesspeople from Lagos
Nigerian chief executives
Nigerian venture capitalists
20th-century births
Angel investors
Yoruba women in business
University of Cincinnati alumni
Nigerian  chairpersons of corporations
American people of Yoruba descent
American people of Nigerian descent
Yale University alumni
Harvard University alumni
Women corporate directors